The 1997–98 Washington Huskies men's basketball team represented the University of Washington for the 1997–98 NCAA Division I men's basketball season. Led by fifth-year head coach Bob Bender, the Huskies were members of the Pacific-10 Conference and played their home games on campus at Hec Edmundson Pavilion in Seattle, Washington.

There was no conference tournament this season; last played in 1990, it resumed in 2002.

Washington returned to the NCAA tournament for the first time in twelve years and won for the first time since 1984. Seeded eleventh in the East regional, they upset Xavier by a point in the first round, and handled fourteen seed Richmond in the second round.

In the Sweet Sixteen, Washington nearly upset second seed Connecticut; a rebound jumper at the buzzer by Richard Hamilton allowed UConn to escape with a one-point win.

Postseason results

|-
!colspan=6 style=| NCAA tournament

References

External links
Sports Reference – Washington Huskies: 1997–98 basketball season

Washington Huskies men's basketball seasons
Washington Huskies
Washington Huskies
Washington
Washington